The Minhas or Manhas is a Rajput Clan. They are found in Punjab, Himachal Pradesh and Jammu and Kashmir. These are spread in most of the part of Gagwan and  Jhatgali of district Ramban. It is found in Hindu, Muslim and Sikh communities.

Notable people 
Notable people with this surname, who may or may not have a connection to the clan, include:

 Arafat Minhas, a Pakistani cricketer
 Bagicha Singh Minhas, an Indian economist.
 Dolly Minhas, an Indian actor and model.
 Khudadad Khan, the first Indian soldier to receive a Victoria Cross in the First World War.
 Manjit Minhas, a Canadian entrepreneur and television personality.
 Masud Minhas, an Indian field hockey player.
 Mithun Manhas, an Indian first-class cricketer.
 Muhammed Akbar Khan, the seniormost officer of the Pakistan Army.
 Mushtaq Minhas, a Pakistani politician and former television journalist.
 Rashid Minhas, a Pakistan Air Force officer.
 Zaffar Iqbal Manhas, an Indian writer, poet, social activist, and Pahari politician.

References

Rajput clans